In the mathematical subfield of numerical analysis, an I-spline is a monotone spline function.

Definition

A family of I-spline functions of degree k with n free parameters is defined in terms of the M-splines Mi(x|k, t)

where L is the lower limit of the domain of the splines.

Since M-splines are non-negative, I-splines are monotonically non-decreasing.

Computation

Let j be the index such that tj ≤ x < tj+1.  Then Ii(x|k, t) is zero if i > j, and equals one if j − k + 1 > i.  Otherwise,

Applications

I-splines can be used as basis splines for regression analysis and data transformation when monotonicity is desired (constraining the regression coefficients to be non-negative for a non-decreasing fit, and non-positive for a non-increasing fit).

References

Splines (mathematics)